Franciscus Josephus Henricus "Frans" Künen (17 April 1930 – 23 November 2011) was a Dutch long-distance runner. He competed in the marathon at the 1960 Summer Olympics in Rome and finished in 36th place. He held the Dutch records in the 10,000 m from 1956 to 1958 and in the Marathon from 1960 to 1969.

Künen started training in running at age 20, while working as a sports instructor at the Dutch Air Force. In 1956, he set a national record in the 10,000 m and won a national cross-country title. Later he became national champion in the 10,000 m (1959, 1961) and marathon (1960). The 1960 title was his first attempt at marathon, and it set a new national record. Internationally, Künen competed in country matches and International Military Championships, winning the 5,000 m in 1956. His best achievement at the International Cross Country Championships (forerunner of the World Championships) was 21st place in 1957.

References

1930 births
2011 deaths
Dutch male long-distance runners
Dutch male marathon runners
Athletes (track and field) at the 1960 Summer Olympics
Olympic athletes of the Netherlands
Sportspeople from Breda
20th-century Dutch people